Jake Hancock (born 28 November 1991) is an Australian cricketer. He made his first-class debut for Tasmania in the 2016–17 Sheffield Shield season on 5 December 2016.

References

External links
 

1991 births
Living people
Australian cricketers
Tasmania cricketers
Place of birth missing (living people)